Mirjana Sistek-Djordjevic (born July 23, 1935) is a Serbian composer who was born in Belgrade. She was one of the first Serbian women composers to earn a Doctor of Musical Arts (DMA) degree.

Sistek-Djordjevic attended the Academy of Music in Belgrade, where she studied with Stanojlo Rajcic and Petar Bergamo. She was a music professor at the Mokranjac Music School. Her students included Aleksandar Kostić.

Compositions

Chamber 

String Quartet
Study (flute)
Theme with Six Variations (2 clarinets)
Three Sketches (violin and piano)

Orchestra 

Piano Concerto
Symphony in One Movement

Piano 

Klaviska Suita
Piano Trio
Sonata
Suites
Variations

Vocal 

Mrazova Sestrica (mixed chorus)
Trazim Pomilovanje (I Seek Pardon; women’s chorus and orchestra; text by Desanka Maksimović)

References 

Women composers
String quartet composers
Serbian music educators
Serbian composers
University of Arts in Belgrade alumni
1935 births
Living people
People from Belgrade